Lushui is a county-level city in and the seat of Nujiang Prefecture, western Yunnan Province, China. It borders Myanmar's Kachin State to the west and occupies the southern fifth of Nujiang Prefecture.

Administrative divisions
Lushui City has 6 towns, 2 townships and 1 ethnic township. 
6 towns

2 townships
 Chenggan
 Gudeng
1 ethnic township
 Luobenzhuo Bai

Climate

See also
Three Parallel Rivers of Yunnan Protected Areas - Unesco World Heritage Site
Gaoligong Mountains

References

External links
Lushui City Official Website

County-level divisions of Nujiang Prefecture
Cities in Yunnan